Christian Vadim (born 18 June 1963) is a French actor. He is the son of actress Catherine Deneuve and film director Roger Vadim.

Career

He made his film debut in 1983, working with his father in the film Surprise Party, and appeared  in Éric Rohmer's Full Moon in Paris the following year.

In 1999, he played Bloch in Time Regained (directed by Raúl Ruiz), which also starred his mother Catherine Deneuve. He then worked again with Ruiz on Love Torn in a Dream (2000), Savage Souls (2001), A Place Among the Living (2003), That Day (2003) and Night Across the Street (2012).

Filmography
Surprise Party (1983) - Christian Bourget
College (1984) - Marco Poggi
Full Moon in Paris (1984) - Bastien
La Punyalada (1990)
 (1991) - Michel
El invierno en Lisboa (1991) - Jim Biralbo
Jalousie (1991) - Pierre
Aire libre (1996) - Alexander von Humboldt, young
 (1998) - Audiard
Time Regained (1999) - Bloch
Love Torn in a Dream (2000) - David
Savage Souls (2001) - Le pasteur
La famille selon Mathieu (2002) - Mathieu
Les liaisons dangereuses (2003, TV movie)
Rien que du bonheur (2003) - José
That Day (2003) - Ritter
Il était une fois Jean-Sébastien Bach... (2003, TV movie) - Jean-Sébastien Bach
A Place Among the Living (2003) - Ernest Ripper
 (2004, TV movie) - Antoine Léoni
Un truc dans le genre (2005) - Pierre Antoine Le Pelletier
Le crime est notre affaire (2008)
 (2011)
 (2012) - Jacky
Night Across the Street (2012) - Jean Giono
Lines of Wellington (2012) - Marechal Soult
Valentin Valentin (2015) - Sergio

External links

1963 births
Living people
20th-century French male actors
21st-century French male actors
French male film actors
French male stage actors
French male television actors
French people of Russian descent
Dorléac family